The 1920 Tour de France was the 14th edition of Tour de France, one of cycling's Grand Tours. The Tour began in Paris with a flat stage on 27 June, and Stage 9 occurred on 14 July with a mountainous stage from Aix-en-Provence. The race finished in Paris on 27 July.

Stage 9
14 July 1920 — Aix-en-Provence to Nice,

Stage 10
16 July 1920 — Nice to Grenoble,

Stage 11
18 July 1920 — Grenoble to Gex, Ain,

Stage 12
20 July 1920 — Gex to Strasbourg,

Stage 13
22 July 1920 — Strasbourg to Metz,

Stage 14
24 July 1920 — Metz to Dunkerque,

Stage 15
27 July 1920 — Dunkerque to Paris,

References

1920 Tour de France
Tour de France stages